Higher education accreditation in the United States is a peer review process by which the validity of degrees and credits awarded by higher education institutions is assured. It is coordinated by accreditation commissions made up of member institutions. It was first undertaken in the late 19th century by cooperating educational institutions, on a regional basis.

The federal government began to play a limited role in higher education accreditation in 1952 with reauthorization of the G.I. Bill for Korean War veterans. The original GI Bill legislation had stimulated establishment of new colleges and universities to accommodate the influx of new students; but some of these new institutions were of dubious quality. The 1952 legislation designated the existing peer review process as the basis for measuring institutional quality; GI Bill eligibility was limited to students enrolled at accredited institutions included on a list of federally recognized accredited institutions published by the U.S. Commissioner of Education.

The U.S. Department of Education and the Council for Higher Education Accreditation (CHEA) (a non-governmental organization) both recognize reputable accrediting bodies for institutions of higher education and provide guidelines as well as resources and relevant data regarding these accreditors. Neither the U.S. Department of Education nor CHEA accredit individual institutions. With the creation of the U.S. Department of Education and under the terms of the Higher Education Act of 1965, as amended, the U.S. Secretary of Education is required by law to publish a list of nationally recognized accrediting agencies that the secretary has determined to be reliable authorities on the quality of education or training provided by the institutions of higher education and the higher education programs they accredit.

Professional schools, which are often graduate schools, have separate organizations for accreditation.

Institutional accreditation

Institutional accreditation applies to the entire institution, specific programs, and distance education within an institution.

Regional and national accreditation
Prior to 2020, there were regional and national accrediting agencies, both of which were accountable to the Department of Education. Regional bodies historically accredited institutions in a particular region of the country. National bodies were established to accredit institutions across the country, and sometimes beyond it. Within American higher education, regional bodies were considered more prestigious.

In February 2020, the Department of Education eliminated the distinction between regional and national accrediting agencies, creating one unified set of institutional accreditors. The department claimed that the change was intended to encourage cooperation between accredited schools to improve student experiences, uphold quality standards, and reduce the cost of higher education by encouraging transparent transfer of credits and mutual recognition of degrees between schools with common standards. It also claimed that the change was intended to allow students to be able to access the best school for their needs no matter what region they reside in.

Four months after this change was made, the WASC Senior College and University Commission became the first accreditor to formally change its membership rules and requirements to allow institutions outside its historical geographic region to apply for membership and accreditation. 

Historically, educational accreditation activities in the United States were overseen by seven regional accrediting agencies established in the late 19th and early 20th century to foster articulation between secondary schools and higher education institutions, particularly evaluation of prospective students by colleges and universities. These seven agencies were membership organizations of educational institutions within their geographic regions. Initially, the main focus of the organizations was to accredit secondary schools and to establish uniform college entrance requirements.  Accreditation of colleges and universities followed later, with each of the accrediting agencies splitting into separate organizations with one or more of those organizations focused exclusively on accrediting colleges and universities. The higher education institutions holding regional accreditation were primarily non-profit institutions, with significant exceptions, as the largest US for-profit universities (e.g., University of Phoenix, Grand Canyon University) achieved regional accreditation.

Regionally accredited schools were usually academically oriented and most were non-profit. Nationally accredited schools, a large number of which are for-profit, typically offered specific vocational, career, or technical programs. Regionally accredited institutions employed large numbers of full-time faculty, and the faculty set the academic policies. Regionally-accredited schools were required to have adequate library facilities. Except for some specific subject areas such as nursing, nationally-accredited schools did not hire many full-time faculty, usually hiring faculty by the course, without benefits and with no influence on the school's academic policies, which were determined by non-academic administrators, and ultimately investors. Their library facilities, if they existed at all, were far inferior to those of regionally-accredited schools. While there were some legitimate and well-intentioned nationally accredited schools, by and large they existed not to educate, but to make money for their investors. They lived on federal student aid and very high tuitions, often leaving graduating students with credentials of little value and large student loans, often without job prospects by which to pay them off. Critics considered national accreditation to be disreputable. Schools accredited by the Accrediting Commission of Career Schools and Colleges, a national accreditor, were occasionally sued for leading prospective students to believe, incorrectly, that they would have no problem transferring their credits to a regionally accredited school.

Recognized institutional accreditors
The U.S. Department of Education recognizes the following organizations as institutional accreditors:
 Academy of Nutrition and Dietetics, Accreditation Council for Education in Nutrition and Dietetics
 Accrediting Bureau of Health Education Schools
 Accreditation Commission for Acupuncture and Oriental Medicine
 Accreditation Commission for Education in Nursing
 Accrediting Commission of Career Schools and Colleges
 Accrediting Council for Continuing Education and Training
 Accrediting Council for Independent Colleges and Schools
 American Bar Association
 American Board of Funeral Service Education
 American Osteopathic Association
 American Podiatric Medical Association
 Association for Biblical Higher Education
 Association of Advanced Rabbinical and Talmudic Schools
 Association of Institutions of Jewish Studies
 Association of Theological Schools
 Commission on Massage Therapy Accreditation
 Council on Accreditation of Nurse Anesthesia Educational Programs
 Council on Chiropractic Education
 Council on Occupational Education
 Distance Education Accrediting Commission
 Higher Learning Commission
 Joint Review Committee on Education in Radiologic Technology
 Middle States Commission on Higher Education
 Middle States Commission on Secondary Schools
 International Association for Learner Driven Schools
 Midwifery Education Accreditation Council
 Montessori Accreditation Council for Teacher Education
 National Accrediting Commission of Career Arts and Sciences
 National Association of Schools of Art and Design
 National Association of Schools of Dance
 National Association of Schools of Music
 National Association of Schools of Theatre
 New England Commission of Higher Education
 New York State Board of Regents, and the Commissioner of Education
 Northwest Commission on Colleges and Universities
 Southern Association of Colleges and Schools
 Transnational Association of Christian Colleges and Schools
 WASC Accrediting Commission for Community and Junior Colleges
 WASC Senior College and University Commission

Programmatic accreditation
These accreditors typically cover a specific program of professional education or training, but in some cases they cover the whole institution. Best practices are shared and developed through affiliation with the Association of Professional and Specialized Accreditors. Both the US Department of Education and CHEA maintain lists of recognized US programmatic accreditors:

 Accreditation Commission for Acupuncture and Oriental Medicine (ACAOM) (Not CHEA-recognized, USDE-recognized)
 Accreditation Commission for Audiology Education (ACAE) (CHEA-recognized, not USDE-recognized)
 Accreditation Commission for Education in Nursing (ACEN) (CHEA-recognized, USDE-recognized)
 Accreditation Commission for Midwifery Education (ACME) (Not CHEA-recognized, USDE-recognized although not eligible for Title IV funding)
 Accreditation Council for Business Schools and Programs (ACBSP) (CHEA-recognized, not USDE-recognized)
 Accreditation Council for Education in Nutrition and Dietetics, Academy of Nutrition and Dietetics (ACEND) (Not CHEA-recognized, USDE-recognized)
 Accreditation Council for Pharmacy Education (ACPE) (CHEA-recognized, USDE-recognized although not eligible for Title IV funding)
 Accreditation Council on Optometric Education (ACOE) (CHEA-recognized, USDE-recognized although not eligible for Title IV funding)
 Accreditation Review Commission on Education for the Physician Assistant (ARC-PA) (CHEA-recognized, not USDE-recognized)
 Accrediting Bureau of Health Education Schools (ABHES) (Not CHEA-recognized, USDE-recognized)
 Accrediting Council on Education in Journalism and Mass Communications (ACEJMC) (CHEA-recognized, not USDE-recognized)
 American Academy of Forensic Sciences Forensic Science Education Programs Accreditation Commission (AAFS-FEPAC) (CHEA-recognized, not USDE-recognized)
 American Association of Family and Consumer Sciences, Council for Accreditation (AAFCS-CFA) (CHEA-recognized, not USDE-recognized)
 American Board of Funeral Service Education, Committee on Accreditation (ABFSE) (CHEA-recognized, USDE-recognized)
 American Council for Construction Education (ACCE) (CHEA-recognized, not USDE-recognized)
 American Culinary Federation Education Foundation, Accrediting Commission (ACFEF-AC) (CHEA-recognized, not USDE-recognized)
 American Library Association, Committee on Accreditation (ALA-CoA) (CHEA-recognized, not USDE-recognized)
 American Occupational Therapy Association, Accreditation Council for Occupational Therapy Education (AOTA-ACOTE) (CHEA-recognized, USDE-recognized although not eligible for Title IV funding)
 American Osteopathic Association, Commission on Osteopathic College Accreditation (AOA-COCA) (Not CHEA-recognized, USDE-recognized)
 American Physical Therapy Association, Commission on Accreditation in Physical Therapy Education (APTA-CAPTE) (CHEA-recognized, USDE-recognized although not eligible for Title IV funding)
 American Podiatric Medical Association, Council on Podiatric Medical Education (APMA-CPME) (CHEA-recognized, USDE-recognized)
 American Psychological Association, Commission on Accreditation (APA-CoA) (CHEA-recognized, USDE-recognized although not eligible for Title IV funding)
 American Veterinary Medical Association, Council on Education (AVMA-COE) (CHEA-recognized, USDE-recognized although not eligible for Title IV funding)
 Association for Advancing Quality in Educator Preparation (AAQEP) (CHEA-recognized, not USDE-recognized)
 Association for Behavior Analysis International Accreditation Board (ABAI) (CHEA-recognized, not USDE-recognized)
 Association for Biblical Higher Education Commission on Accreditation (ABHE) (CHEA-recognized, USDE-recognized)
 Association for Clinical Pastoral Education, Accreditation Commission (ACPE Inc) (Not CHEA-recognized, USDE-recognized although not eligible for Title IV funding)
 Association of Technology, Management, and Applied Engineering (ATMAE) (CHEA-recognized, not USDE-recognized)
 Aviation Accreditation Board International (AABI) (CHEA-recognized, not USDE-recognized)
 Commission on Accreditation for Health Informatics and Information Management Education (CAHIIM) (CHEA-recognized, not USDE-recognized)
 Commission on Accreditation for Marriage and Family Therapy Education, American Association for Marriage and Family Therapy (COAMFTE-AAMFT) (CHEA-recognized, not USDE-recognized)
 Commission on Accreditation for Respiratory Care (CoARC) (CHEA-recognized, not USDE-recognized)
 Commission on Accreditation of Allied Health Education Programs (CAAHEP) (CHEA-recognized, not USDE-recognized)
 Commission on Accreditation of Athletic Training Education (CAATE) (CHEA-recognized, not USDE-recognized)
 Commission on Accreditation of Healthcare Management Education (CAHME) (CHEA-recognized, not USDE-recognized)
 Commission on Accreditation of Medical Physics Education Programs (CAMPEP) (CHEA-recognized, not USDE-recognized)
 Commission on Collegiate Nursing Education (CCNE) (Not CHEA-recognized, USDE-recognized although not eligible for Title IV funding)
 Commission on Dental Accreditation, American Dental Association (CODA) (Not CHEA-recognized, USDE-recognized although not eligible for Title IV funding)
 Commission on English Language Program Accreditation (CEA) (Not CHEA-recognized, USDE-recognized although not eligible for Title IV funding)
 Commission on Massage Therapy Accreditation (COMTA) (Not CHEA-recognized, USDE-recognized)
 Commission on Opticianry Accreditation (COA-OP) (CHEA-recognized, not USDE-recognized)
 Commission on Sport Management Accreditation (COSMA) (CHEA-recognized, not USDE-recognized)
 Council for Accreditation of Counseling and Related Educational Programs (CACREP) (CHEA-recognized, not USDE-recognized)
 Council for Interior Design Accreditation (CIDA) (CHEA-recognized, not USDE-recognized)
 Council for Standards in Human Service Education (CSHSE) (CHEA-recognized, not USDE-recognized)
 Council for the Accreditation of Educator Preparation (CAEP) (CHEA-recognized, not USDE-recognized)
 Council of the Section of Legal Education and Admissions to the Bar, American Bar Association (ABA) (Not CHEA-recognized, USDE-recognized)
 Council on Academic Accreditation in Audiology and Speech-Language Pathology, American Speech-Language-Hearing Association (CAA-ASHA) (CHEA-recognized, USDE-recognized although not eligible for Title IV funding)
 Council on Accreditation of Nurse Anesthesia Educational Programs (COA) (CHEA-recognized, USDE-recognized)
 Council on Accreditation of Parks, Recreation, Tourism and Related Professions (COAPRT) (CHEA-recognized, not USDE-recognized)
 Council on Chiropractic Education (CCE) (CHEA-recognized, USDE-recognized)
 Council on Education for Public Health (CEPH) (Not CHEA-recognized, USDE-recognized although not eligible for Title IV funding)
 Council on Naturopathic Medical Education (CNME) (Not CHEA-recognized, USDE-recognized although not eligible for Title IV funding)
 Council on Social Work Education, Commission on Accreditation (CSWE-COA) (CHEA-recognized, not USDE-recognized)
 International Accreditation Council for Business Education (IACBE) (CHEA-recognized, not USDE-recognized)
 International Fire Service Accreditation Congress - Degree Assembly (IFSAC-DA) (CHEA-recognized, not USDE-recognized)
 Joint Review Committee on Education in Radiologic Technology (JRCERT) (CHEA-recognized, USDE-recognized)
 Joint Review Committee on Educational Programs in Nuclear Medicine Technology (JRCNMT) (CHEA-recognized, not USDE-recognized)
 Landscape Architectural Accreditation Board, American Society of Landscape Architects (LAAB-ASLA) (CHEA-recognized, not USDE-recognized)
 Liaison Committee on Medical Education (LCME) (Not CHEA-recognized, USDE-recognized although not eligible for Title IV funding)
 Masters in Psychology and Counseling Accreditation Council (MPCAC) (CHEA-recognized, not USDE-recognized)
 Midwifery Education Accreditation Council (MEAC) (Not CHEA-recognized, USDE-recognized)
 Montessori Accreditation Council for Teacher Education (MACTE) (Not CHEA-recognized, USDE-recognized)
 National Accrediting Agency for Clinical Laboratory Sciences (NAACLS) (CHEA-recognized, not USDE-recognized)
 National Association for the Education of Young Children (NAEYC) (CHEA-recognized, not USDE-recognized)
 National Association of Schools of Art and Design Commission on Accreditation (NASAD) (Not CHEA-recognized, USDE-recognized)
 National Association of Schools of Dance Commission on Accreditation (NASD) (Not CHEA-recognized, USDE-recognized)
 National Association of Schools of Music Commission on Accreditation (NASM) (Not CHEA-recognized, USDE-recognized)
 National Association of Schools of Theatre Commission on Accreditation (NAST) (Not CHEA-recognized, USDE-recognized)
 National Council for Accreditation of Teacher Education (NCATE) (CHEA-recognized, USDE-recognized)
 Network of Schools of Public Policy, Affairs, and Administration, Commission on Peer Review and Accreditation (NASPAA-COPRA) (CHEA-recognized, not USDE-recognized)
 Planning Accreditation Board (PAB) (CHEA-recognized, not USDE-recognized)
 Psychological Clinical Science Accreditation System (PCSAS) (CHEA-recognized, not USDE-recognized)
 Teacher Education Accreditation Council (TEAC) (CHEA-recognized, USDE-recognized)

Other recognized accreditors
Several organizations exist that accredit institutions and which are not recognized by the U.S. Department of Education or CHEA. These include:
 The State Bar of California Committee of Bar Examiners

Religious accreditors 
Although many schools related to religious organizations hold regional accreditation or secular national accreditation, there are four different agencies that specialize in accreditation of religious schools:
 Association of Advanced Rabbinical and Talmudic Schools (AARTS)
 Association of Theological Schools in the United States and Canada (ATS)
 Association for Biblical Higher Education (ABHE)
 Transnational Association of Christian Colleges and Schools (TRACS)
These groups specialize in accrediting theological and religious schools including seminaries and graduate schools of theology, as well as broader-scope universities that teach from a religious viewpoint and may require students and/or faculty to subscribe to a statement of faith. Additionally, as of 2009, 20 U.S. states and Puerto Rico had some form of exemption provision under which religious institutions can grant religious degrees without accreditation or government oversight.

Use of .edu top-level Internet domain

Since 2001, the use of the top-level internet domain, .edu has been restricted to accredited institutions, but non-qualifying institutions can still use .edu domain names obtained before the current rules came into force. Academia.edu is a for-profit social networking site for academics.

Criticism of accreditation
Various commenters have written about the role and effectiveness of the American accreditation system. It has drawn particular interest since the rise of e-learning classes and institutions. A frequent point of discussion and criticism is that the traditional system is limited to measuring "input" factors, such as adequate facilities and properly credentialed faculty, rather than the quality of a school's educational output.

In his 1996 book Crisis in the Academy, Christopher J. Lucas criticized the accreditation system as too expensive, onerously complicated, incestuous in its organization, and not properly tied to quality. Similarly, a 2002 report by George C. Leef and Roxana D. Burris of the American Council of Trustees and Alumni (ACTA) argued that the system does not ensure or protect educational quality, while still imposing significant costs. In a 2006 "issue paper", Robert C. Dickeson wrote that a lack of transparency, low and lax standards, and outdated regionalization were among the problems with regional accreditation. Others, such as Edward M. Elmendorf of the American Association of State Colleges and Universities, reject these claims, arguing that they are "picking around the edges" of a proven and necessary system for upholding standards. Thomas C. Reeves notes that some schools unable or unwilling to meet the standards of traditional, regional accrediting bodies are closely involves, have begun much involved in creating national accrediting agencies with significantly lower standards.

At various times the U.S. government has investigated changes to the accreditation system. In 2002 the House of Representatives Subcommittee on 21st Century Competitiveness criticized the system. Accreditation was a major topic of the Spellings Commission, which released its report on September 26, 2006. The Council for Higher Education Accreditation recognizes that there are criticisms, but has opposed these calls for reform, with President Judith S. Eaton arguing that the system is successful and needs to remain flexible to accommodate differences between schools and disciplines. In 2013, President Barack Obama proposed changes in the accreditation system to hold "colleges accountable for cost, value, and quality". He requested Congress change the Higher Education Act so that affordability and value are considered in determining which institutions are accredited and allow students access to federal financial aid; his criticism was directed at for-profit institutions.

An article published by "University World News" on 2 February 2018 stated that the higher education accreditation community, which confers the quality-assurance seal of approval that allows United States colleges and universities access to billions of dollars of federal student aid, must do a better job of explaining itself to the public if it wants to reverse waning public confidence in higher education. That was one of the tamer recommendations voiced at a conference for accreditors, who are feeling the brunt of growing scepticism about the value of a US college degree.

See also
 List of recognized higher education accreditation organizations
 List of unrecognized higher education accreditation organizations
 Accreditation mill

Notes

References

External links
Accreditation: Postsecondary Education Institutions – U.S. Department of Education

United States
Accrediation